Kupolo is a populated place in south-east Kauai in the Hawaiian Islands.

References

Geography of Kauai